Jaala is a former municipality of Finland.

It is located in the province of Southern Finland and is part of the Kymenlaakso region. The municipality had a population of 1,906 (2003) and covered an area of 563.06 km² of which 129.89 km² was water. The population density was 3.4 inhabitants per km².

The municipality was unilingually Finnish.

In 2009, the six municipalities of Kouvola, Kuusankoski, Elimäki, Anjalankoski, Valkeala and Jaala were consolidated to form a new municipality named Kouvola, which, with a population of over 80,000, became the tenth largest city in Finland.

People born in Jaala 
Valto Koski (1939 – )
Ville Iiskola (1985 – )

External links 

Kouvola
Populated places disestablished in 2009
2009 disestablishments in Finland
Former municipalities of Finland